Originals is a posthumous demo album by American musician Prince, released through Warner Records on June 7, 2019 (on what would have been Prince's 61st birthday), exclusively through Tidal, with a wide release following on June 21, 2019. It compiles the original demo versions of songs Prince wrote and gave to other artists. All except for Prince's recording of "Nothing Compares 2 U", which was first officially released in 2018, were previously unreleased. The demo album was met with widespread critical acclaim, and debuted at number 15 on the Billboard 200, as well as the top 10 in Belgium, Hungary, Portugal, and Switzerland.

Background
The songs were written and the demos recorded from the early 1980s to the early 1990s, but a specific emphasis was placed on those recorded between 1981 and 1985 due to the size of Prince's unreleased archive. Troy Carter, a music manager and entertainment adviser to Prince's estate, selected the tracks, with some input from Jay-Z, who "pushed" for Prince's demo for Martika's 1991 single "Love... Thy Will Be Done" to be included.

Critical reception

Originals was met with widespread critical acclaim. At Metacritic, the album received an average score of 88, based on 17 reviews.

Rebecca Bengal of Pitchfork awarded the album a "Best New Reissue" tag and said that "Hearing Prince sing these songs that he gave to other performers brings you close to the pulse of his artistry: transgressive, funky, sexy, a testament to his genius even in the form of demos." Wyndham Wallace of Classic Pop wrote that "the slow unveiling of Prince's private recordings remains suitably seductive, if – true to form – wilfully unpredictable," noting that the record's "greatest revelation is how few artists strayed far from the Prince template of these Originals." Adam Mattera in Echoes wrote "fans can debate amongst themselves whether Morris Day’s pimp loverboy croon tops Prince’s coquettish Valentino vocal approach to the creamy slow jam "Gigolos Get Lonely Too", but what’s in no doubt is the virtuosity of the talent that tossed out these funk diamonds and pop pearls with abandon through the 80s into the mid 90s."

Track listing

Charts

Weekly charts

Year-end charts

Release history

References

External links
 Interview with Michael Howe (Vault Archivist) on Originals and more

2019 albums
Albums produced by Prince (musician)
Albums published posthumously
Demo albums
NPG Records albums
Prince (musician) albums
Warner Records albums